Bruce Highway Western Alternative is a proposed highway from  to  in Queensland, Australia.

Funding and program status
As at July 2022 funding of $20 million has been allocated for the planning study. Planning is being progressed in four stages. The alignment for stage 1 has been confirmed, and planning for stage 2 is continuing.

Stage 1
It passes through Upper Caboolture, crosses the Caboolture River, and then passes through .

Stage 2

Stages 3 and 4
Stage 3 is from Kallangur to Narangba, and stage 4 is from Moodlu to Beerburrum.

Development west of Caboolture
The land adjacent to stage 1 of the road is the site of a new regional city to be known as Caboolture West. It is planned that, over the next 40 years, it will grow to accommodate 30,000 new homes with a population of 70,000.

References 

Roads in Queensland